Victor Öhling Norberg (born 22 May 1990) is a Swedish freestyle skier. Born in Bruksvallarna, he competed in ski cross at the World Ski Championships 2013, and at the 2014 Winter Olympics as well as at the 2018 Winter Olympics, in ski-cross.

He won a gold-medal during the  FIS Freestyle Ski and Snowboarding World Championships 2017 in Sierra Nevada.

On 23 April 2019, he announced his retirement from skicrossing.

World Cup results

Season titles

Wins

References

External links

 
 
 
 
 

1990 births
Living people
Freestyle skiers at the 2014 Winter Olympics
Freestyle skiers at the 2018 Winter Olympics
Swedish male freestyle skiers
Olympic freestyle skiers of Sweden
21st-century Swedish people